Ponce-Davis is an unincorporated community in Miami-Dade County, Florida, United States.

The community is named for Ponce De Leon Road (Southwest 49th Avenue), the primary north-south road in the community, and for Davis Drive (Southwest 80th Street), the primary east-west road.

Geography
Ponce-Davis borders the city of Coral Gables to the north, east, and south, the city of South Miami to the west, and the unincorporated community of High Pines to the northwest.

Ponce-Davis is mostly residential and consists mainly of single-family homes; there are no commercial districts within the community.

History
In 2018, the neighboring city of Coral Gables made a proposal to annex Ponce-Davis and High Pines. In 2019 Miami-Dade County rejected this proposal along with a similar proposal to annex the unincorporated community of Little Gables.

Education
Ponce-Davis is home to Our Lady of Lourdes Academy, a Catholic all-girls high school.

References

Unincorporated communities in Florida